1992–93 Ukrainian First League was the second season of the Ukrainian First League.

The league was reorganized from the previous season into a single group of 22 teams of which the best one was Nyva Vinnytsia. The league was joined by six clubs relegated from the Ukrainian Premier League, while no clubs were promoted from the Ukrainian Second League. The biggest favorite of the season FC Naftovyk Okhtyrka missed its chance to get back to the League of the strongest. Impressive season was for the FC Vorskla Poltava and FC Polihraftekhnika Oleksandria who will be setting a pace in the following years in the league. Disappointing season had FC Metalurh Nikopol and FC Pryladyst Mukacheve that nearly made it to the Top League last season.

Promotion and relegation

Promoted teams
 None 

There were no clubs promoted from the 1992 Ukrainian Transition League.

Relegated teams 
Six clubs were relegated from the 1992 Ukrainian Top League:
Group A
 Nyva Vinnytsia – 8th place
 Evis Mykolaiv – 9th place
 Temp Shepetivka – 10th place
Group B
 Naftovyk Okhtyrka – 8th place
 Prykarpattya Ivano-Frankivsk – 9th place
 SC Odesa – 10th place

Renamed teams
 At winter break Podillya Khmelnytskyi was renamed to Nord-Am-Podillia Khmelnytskyi.

Teams
In 1992-93 season, the Ukrainian First League consists of the following teams:

Stadiums 
The following stadiums are considered home grounds for the teams in the competition.

Managers

Final standings

Top scorers
Statistics are taken from here.

See also
1992–93 Ukrainian Premier League
1992–93 Ukrainian Second League
1992–93 Ukrainian Transitional League
1992–93 Ukrainian Cup

References 

Ukrainian First League seasons
2
Ukra